Athrips studiosa is a moth of the family Gelechiidae. It is found in Sri Lanka.

The wingspan is 9–10 mm. The forewings are pale whitish-ochreous, brownish-tinged, towards the apex with the scales somewhat roughened. There is an obscure streak of fuscous suffusion from the disc beyond the middle to the apex. The hindwings are pale whitish-ochreous.

References

Moths described in 1905
Athrips
Moths of Sri Lanka